The 1916 South Tyrone by-election was held on 28 February 1916.  The by-election was held due to the death of the incumbent Irish Unionist MP, Andrew Horner. It was won by the Irish Unionist candidate William Coote, who was unopposed.

References

1916 elections in Ireland
1916 elections in the United Kingdom
By-elections to the Parliament of the United Kingdom in County Tyrone constituencies
Unopposed by-elections to the Parliament of the United Kingdom (need citation)
20th century in County Tyrone